Fadil Daniel Matos, known as Dani Matos is a Professional Portuguese football player born in Luxemburg on 01.06.2004

Club career
He made his professional debut in the Segunda Liga for Academica de Coimbra  on 24 August in a game against Desportivo das Aves.

References 

 https://www.zerozero.pt/player.php?id=1054372&search=1

2.    
Kicker Dani Matos

External links 

Dani Matos

Sofascore.com Profil

1983 births
Living people
People from Castelo Branco, Portugal
Portuguese footballers
Sport Benfica e Castelo Branco players
S.C. Covilhã players
Liga Portugal 2 players
Association football midfielders
Sportspeople from Castelo Branco District